Barton was launched at Hull in 1811. She sailed as a general trader and made voyages to the West Indies and the East Indies. She was lost in 1823 on a voyage to the Baltic.

Career
Barton first appeared in Lloyd's Register in 1811 with Mason, master, Barkworth, owner, and trade London–Jamaica.

In 1813 the British East India Company (EIC) lost its monopoly on trade between Britain and India. Many shipowners then sailed their vessels under a license from the EIC on voyages on that route.

One list of "Licensed Ships" shows Barton sailing from Southampton to Bombay in 1818. A list in Lloyd's Register shows Barton, T. Forest, master, sailing on 18 August 1818 to Bombay.

The Register of Shipping for 1824 showed Barton, J. Bacon, master, Barkworth, owner, and trade Hull-Petersburg, Russia.

Fate
Barton, Bacon, master, was wrecked on 9 September 1823 on the west coast of Jutland while she was on a voyage from to Hull to Petersburg. Her crew were rescued.

Citations

References
 

1811 ships
Age of Sail merchant ships of England
Maritime incidents in September 1823